is a dam in Shima, Mie Prefecture, Japan.

References 

Dams in Mie Prefecture
Dams completed in 1976